Manisha Malhotra ( Manīṣā Maľhōtrā; born 19 September 1976) is a retired tennis player from India.

Her career high in singles is 314, achieved on 21 April 2003. In doubles, she peaked at No. 149 in the WTA rankings on 8 April 2002.
In her career, Malhotra won five singles and seven doubles titles on the ITF Women's Circuit.

Playing for India at the Fed Cup, Malhotra has a win–loss record of 17–15.

Career
Malhotra represented India at the 2000 Sydney Olympics in the women's doubles tournament, partnering Nirupama Vaidyanathan but lost in the first round to Jelena Dokić and Rennae Stubbs.

At the 2001 PreCon Open in Switzerland, she was defeated in the first qualifying round by Maja Palaveršić. This was her first match at the WTA-level.

Malhotra had her most successful year in 2002, when she was the runner-up at the Busan Asian Games and won the silver medal in the mixed doubles draw, partnering Mahesh Bhupathi.

Malhotra qualified for the 2003 AP Tourism Hyderabad Open, winning three matches; but lost in the first round to Tatiana Poutchek. This was her second and last tournament at the WTA-level.

She retired from professional tennis in 2004. Her last singles match was a loss in the first qualifying round, against Japan's Maki Arai at an ITF $50,000 tournament in Shenzhen, China, in early December, 2003. Her last doubles matches came at the 2004 Fed Cup, where she won three of her ties (against Uzbekistan, South Korea, and Taiwan), and lost one (against Indonesia) (all partnering Sania Mirza).

She along with Sania Mirza holds the record of Longest Fed Cup tie breaks (21-19), which they achieved against Uzbekistan in 2004.

ITF finals

Singles (5–4)

Doubles (7–8)

Other finals

Mixed doubles

References

External links
 
 
 
 http://manishasthoughts.blogspot.com/

1976 births
Living people
Asian Games medalists in tennis
Indian female tennis players
Racket sportspeople from Mumbai
Olympic tennis players of India
Tennis players at the 2000 Summer Olympics
Tennis players at the 1998 Asian Games
Tennis players at the 2002 Asian Games
Asian Games silver medalists for India
Sportswomen from Maharashtra
20th-century Indian women
20th-century Indian people
Medalists at the 2002 Asian Games